Hasan Abdali (also Romanized as Ḩasan Abdālī; also known as Hasanabdāl, Ḩasan ‘Abdāl, and Khasanabdal) is a village in Mojezat Rural District, in the Central District of Zanjan County, Zanjan Province, Iran. At the 2006 census, its population was 276, in 71 families.

References 

Populated places in Zanjan County